April Halprin Wayland (born 1954) is an American children's and young adult author, poet, and teacher.

Biography
April Halprin Wayland was born and raised in Southern California and graduated from University of California, Davis with a degree in Human Development. She worked for the Rand Corporation and was the governess for a Hollywood celebrity before starting a company called Positive Education, Inc. with Elizabeth Howland.

After traveling to Europe and working on kibbutz in Israel, she returned to Los Angeles, married Gary Wayland, worked in the corporate world, and four years later left her job to write full-time. She studied with children's authors Ruth Lercher Bornstein, Sonia Levitin, Susan Goldman Rubin, and many others. For twelve years she studied with children's poet Myra Cohn Livingston.

Wayland's poetry have been included in numerous anthologies and magazines and have won awards from the Society of Children's Book Writers and Illustrators. Her novel in poems, GIRL COMING IN FOR A LANDING, was awarded Pennsylvania State University's Lee Bennett Hopkins Honor Award for Poetry and the Myra Cohn Livingston Award for Best Poetry Book.  Her picture book, NEW YEAR AT THE PIER—A Rosh Hashanah Story, won the Sydney Taylor Book Award for Younger Readers.

Books
More Than Enough: A Passover Story' ', Dial Books for Young Readers, 2016New Year at the Pier: A Rosh Hashanah Story, Dial Books for Young Readers, 2009 (Sydney Taylor Book Award gold medal in the Younger Readers Category)Rabbittown, Scholastic, 1989The Night Horse, Scholastic, 1991It's Not My Turn To Look For Grandma!, Knopf, 1995Girl Coming In For A Landing—A Novel in Poems'', Knopf, 2002

References

External links
 Official website

University of California, Davis alumni
Living people
1954 births
20th-century American writers
21st-century American writers
21st-century American women writers
20th-century American women writers